E/R is an American sitcom that aired on CBS from September 16, 1984, to February 27, 1985.

Developed from the play of the same name created and produced by the Organic Theater Company under the direction of Stuart Gordon and conceived by Dr. Ronald Berman, the series was produced by Embassy Television and lasted a single season. Shuko Akune and Bruce A. Young reprised their roles from the original Organic Theater Company production of the play.

Two of the show's stars, George Clooney and Mary McDonnell, would also be cast in NBC's drama ER.

Synopsis
The main setting is the emergency room (E/R) of a fictional Clark Street Hospital in Chicago, Illinois; the stories are centered upon the happenings in the ER and the lives of the doctors who work there. Principal characters include Dr. Howard Sheinfeld (played by Elliott Gould)—a twice divorced ear, nose, and throat specialist who moonlights at the hospital to keep up with his alimony payments—and his colleague (and potential romantic interest) Dr. Eve Sheridan (played by Marcia Strassman in the pilot and by Mary McDonnell thereafter).

While essentially a comedy, E/R also contained dramatic elements stemming from its hospital setting. As Tom Shales wrote in The Washington Post, "Microcosmic, teetering on tragedy and concerned with group psychology as "M*A*S*H" was, "E/R" mixes black comedy, sick comedy and sudden drama somewhat uneasily but very entertainingly."

Main characters
 Dr. Howard Sheinfeld (Elliott Gould): A twice-divorced otolaryngologist (his wives were named Phyllis and Sheila) and father of two (David, son of Phyllis, and Jenny, daughter of Sheila), who—in order to keep up his alimony payments to said ex-wives—works long hours at Clark Street Hospital's emergency room.  Despite his joking nature and his constant womanizing, he is a compassionate and well-respected doctor.
 Dr. Eve Sheridan (Marcia Strassman in the pilot; Mary McDonnell thereafter): The head doctor in the ER. Born in a medical family (her father was also a doctor), she takes her job very seriously. She tends to come down hard on Howard for his constant joking and his lack of medical protocol, but she is also concerned for him because he works such long hours in the emergency room with absolutely little or nothing to show for it (since whatever money he makes goes to his ex-wives for alimony). At times she is very strict with her staff, almost to the point of angering them, but she truly does mean well and is a fine doctor. Eventually, Eve was able to let her hair down with the staff and was considered their friend.
 Nurse Joan Thor (Conchata Ferrell): The head nurse in the ER. She is close friends with Howard and, like Eve, worries about him. She has a tough exterior, but a heart of gold. She is often seen talking on the phone to her husband, Bud Thor. Her nephew, Mark "Ace" Kolmar, who is an EMT, was hired to work in the ER as a technician. Thor is diagnosed with Hodgkin's disease late in the series' run.
 Nurse Julie Williams (Lynne Moody): Joan's industrious and efficient assistant. She is kind and good natured. Her aunt and uncle are George and Louise Jefferson from The Jeffersons.  She shares an apartment with receptionist Maria Amardo, to help save money.
Maria Amardo (Shuko Akune): The ER's Filipino-American receptionist. Known for her strict enforcement of the white line rule (her catch-phrase, "Stay back of the white line!!"). She dates Officer Fred Burdock, the beat cop, but is afraid of marriage due to her interracial parents' divorce. Shares an apartment with nurse Julie Williams, to help both of them save money.
 Nurse Cory Smith (Corinne Bohrer): A pediatric nurse who comes to help in the ER when it gets too busy. Is in love with Howard, who only sees her as a colleague, due to his being burned by his two divorces.
 Officer Fred Burdock (Bruce A. Young): The beat cop in the area of Chicago where Clark Street Hospital is located. Dates Maria Amardo, of whom he is insanely jealous, although marriage isn't in the cards due to Maria's fear of divorce. Officer Burdock is also close friends with the rest of the ER staff. Diagnosed with high blood pressure late in the series' run. He did go out once, with Maria's roommate, Julie.

A more complete cast list follows:

Reception
The program was canceled after 22 episodes due to low ratings, mainly due to competition from the Top 10 hit The A-Team.

Reruns aired on cable's Lifetime Television from September 5, 1988, to April 24, 1992.

Episodes

References

External links

1984 American television series debuts
1985 American television series endings
1980s American sitcoms
CBS original programming
English-language television shows
1980s American medical television series
Television shows based on plays
Television series by Sony Pictures Television
Television shows set in Chicago